Murad Daudovich Zekokh (born 1 July 1969) is a Russian professional football coach and a former player.

External links
 

1969 births
Living people
Soviet footballers
Russian footballers
Association football midfielders
PFC Spartak Nalchik players
FC Kuban Krasnodar players
FC Zhemchuzhina Sochi players
FC Spartak-UGP Anapa players
Russian Premier League players
Russian football managers